The River Owenabue, also spelled "Owenboy", is a river in County Cork, Ireland.

Geography 
It flows through Crossbarry and on to the small village of Halfway. It then reaches Ballinhassig where it widens into Ballygarvan. It then meanders through Ballea Woods into Carrigaline, and onto Crosshaven where it enters Cork Harbour near Curraghbinny. The area is known as the Owenabue Valley. Otters and herons are seen on the river, and the heron has become a symbol of the area. 10 bridges cross the river.

History 
The Royal Munster Yacht Club (now merged with the Royal Cork Yacht Club) was based on the Owenabue River.

References

Owenboy
Ramsar sites in the Republic of Ireland
River Lee